Carter Barrett (J. Carter Barrett; born June 27) is an American Republican politician from Georgia, currently representing the 24th district in the Georgia House of Representatives.

Education 
Barrett attended high school in Rome, Italy, and he graduated from the University of Georgia with a BBA in finance.

Career and politics 
Originally from Augusta, Barrett moved to Cumming in 1990 working as a banker for Wachovia. He co-founded Forsyth-based Community Business Bank in 2008, before selling it to Community and Southern Bank in 2015. He later worked for Affinity Bank. Barrett is on the board of directors for the Forsyth County Chamber.

In 2022, Barrett defeated incumbent Sheri Gilligan in the primary following a runoff; Gilligan previously opposed aspects of then-Speaker David Ralston's mental health bill, and Ralston's campaign committee supported Barrett, helping him to raise over $280,000. He went on to defeat Democratic challenger Sydney Walker in November 2022.

In an interview in 2022, Barrett said the 24th House district is "the only political office I ever intend to run for."

Barrett is opposed to abortion.

Elections

Primary and general elections, 2022

Personal life 
Barrett lives in Cumming, Georgia with his wife Jamie; they were married in 1995 and have two daughters.

References

Living people
Republican Party members of the Georgia House of Representatives
21st-century American politicians
Year of birth missing (living people)